Cameo Films is an Indian film production and distribution company based in Chennai, Tamil Nadu. It was incorporated in the year 2013 by C. J. Jayakumar. Since then, it has produced three Tamil films, Damaal Dumeel, Trisha Illana Nayanthara, Imaikkaa Nodigal and distributed Kaththi Sandai.

History

Cameo Films was incorporated by C. J. Jayakumar in 2013. Its first production was Shree's Damaal Dumeel starring Vaibhav Reddy and Remya Nambeesan. Their next production was the 2015 film Trisha Illana Nayanthara, directed by Adhik Ravichandran starring G. V. Prakash Kumar. The company then went on to distribute the 2016 film Kaththi Sandai, directed by Suraj starring Vishal and Tamannaah. In 2018, they produced Nayanthara and Anurag Kashyap starring Imaikkaa Nodigal, directed by R. Ajay Gnanamuthu. In 2019, the company established a Digital Content Workstream for producing web series and web films.

Filmography

References

External links

2013 establishments in Tamil Nadu
Film production companies based in Chennai
Film production companies of India
Film production companies of Tamil Nadu
Indian companies established in 2013
Indian film studios
Mass media companies established in 2013
Tamil cinema